During the 1999–2000 French football season, AS Monaco FC competed in the French Ligue 1, winning the title by seven points over nearest challengers Paris Saint-Germain.

Squad
Squad at end of season

Transfers

In:

Out:

Competitions

Division 1

League table

Results summary

Results by round

Matches

Coupe de la Ligue

Coupe de France

UEFA Cup

First round

Second round

Third round

Fourth round

Statistics

Appearances and goals

|-
|colspan="14"|Players who left Monaco during the season:

|}

Goal scorers

Disciplinary record

Notes and references

Notes

References

AS Monaco
AS Monaco FC seasons
French football championship-winning seasons
AS Monaco
AS Monaco